The pale-headed gecko (Heteronotia fasciolata) is a species of gecko. It is endemic to the Northern Territory in Australia.

References

Heteronotia
Reptiles described in 2013
Geckos of Australia
Taxobox binomials not recognized by IUCN